is a Japanese animator, character designer and anime director.

Biography
Beginning his career at Sunrise, he has worked as an animation director and animator on several productions, and made his debut as a director with volumes 2 to 4 of Alien 9 and the 2004 television series Kurau Phantom Memory. He also directed Fullmetal Alchemist: Brotherhood.

He is a member of the Japan Animation Creators Association (JAniCA).

Works

Anime television series
Mama wa Shōgaku 4 Nensei (1992; key animation)
Genki Bakuhatsu Ganbaruger (1992; key animation)
Nekketsu Saikyō Go-Saurer (1993; key animation)
Vision of Escaflowne (1994–1996; animation director, animation assistance, key animation)
Mobile Fighter G Gundam (1994; key animation)
Revolutionary Girl Utena (1997; key animation)
Cowboy Bebop (1998; key animation)
Bakusō Kyōdai Let's & Go!! MAX (1998; key animation)
Uchū Kaizoku Mito no Daibōken (1999; key animation)
Sorcerous Stabber Orphen (1998–1999; key animation)
RahXephon (2002; episode director, animation director, key animation)
Fullmetal Alchemist (2003–2004; OP animation director)
Gunparade March (2003; character design, character animation director, storyboards, episode direction, key animation)
Kurau Phantom Memory (2004; director, screenplay, storyboards, episode direction)
Gaiking: Legend of Daiku-Maryu (2005–2006; key animation)
Soul Eater (2008–2009; OP storyboards, episode direction, key animation)
Nogizaka Haruka no Himitsu (2008; storyboards, episode direction, animation director, key animation)
Fullmetal Alchemist: Brotherhood (2009–10; director)
Code:Breaker (2012; director)
Scorching Ping Pong Girls (2016; director)
Healer Girl (2022; director)

Animated films
Spriggan (1998; key animation)
Escaflowne (2000; original picture animation director)
Digimon Adventure: Bokura no War Game! (2000; key animation)
Cowboy Bebop: Knockin' on Heaven's Door (2001; storyboard assistance)
Fullmetal Alchemist: Conqueror of Shamballa (2005; key animation)
Tekkon Kinkreet (2006; key animation)

ONA
Eden (2021; director)

OVA
Moldiver (1993; key animation)
Giant Robo: The Animation Chikyū ga Seishi Suru hi (1992–1998; key animation)
Yōsei Kisuikoden (1993; key animation)
Fire Emblem: Monshō no Nazo (1996; key animation)
JoJo's Bizarre Bizarre Adventure'''s third chapter: "D'Arby The Gambler" (1994; key animation)Macross Plus episode 3 (1995; key animation)Mobile Suit Gundam: The 08th MS Team (1996–1999; key animation)Alien Nine (2001–2002; character design, animation director, director, Vol. 2- Vol. 4)

GamesExodus Guilty (1998; key animation)NOeL 3'' (1998; animation director)

Sources:

References

External links
IRICOMIX — official website.
 
Interview  at Total Manga 

Japanese animators
Japanese animated film directors
Anime character designers
Anime directors
1971 births
Living people
Sunrise (company) people